The Yugoslav national ice hockey team was the national men's ice hockey in the former republic of Yugoslavia.  They competed in five Olympic Games competitions. This article discusses the team that represented the Socialist Federal Republic of Yugoslavia and its predecessors, but not the Federal Republic of Yugoslavia. For the FRY, please see the Serbia and Montenegro men's national ice hockey team. The team was largely composed of players from Slovenia: throughout its existence 91% of all players on the national team were Slovene, and the entire roster for the team at the 1984 Winter Olympics, held in Sarajevo were from Slovenia.

Olympic record

Thayer Tutt Trophy record

World Championship record

1939 - 13th place
1951 - 6th place in Pool B
1955 - 5th place in Pool B
1961 - 3rd place in Pool C
1963 - 5th place in Pool B
1965 - 7th place in Pool B
1966 - 3rd place in Pool B
1967 - 4th place in Pool B
1969 - 3rd place in Pool B
1970 - 4th place in Pool B
1971 - 5th place in Pool B
1972 - 6th place in Pool B
1973 - 3rd place in Pool B
1974 - 2nd place in Pool B
1975 - 4th place in Pool B
1976 - 5th place in Pool B
1977 - 7th place in Pool B
1978 - 8th place in Pool B
1979 - 1st place in Pool C
1981 - 7th place in Pool B
1982 - 2nd place in Pool C
1983 - 8th place in Pool B
1985 - 2nd place in Pool C
1986 - 7th place in Pool B
1987 - 4th place in Pool C
1989 - 2nd place in Pool C
1990 - 1st place in Pool C
1991 - 6th place in Pool B
1992 - 8th place in Pool B

European Championship record
1939 - 11th place
1964 - 11th place
1968 - 7th place

Successor teams 

Since the breakup of Yugoslavia, the following successor national teams have competed:
Bosnia and Herzegovina men's national ice hockey team
Croatia men's national ice hockey team
Macedonia men's national ice hockey team
Serbia national ice hockey team (Serbia and Montenegro men's national ice hockey team from 1992 to 2006)
Slovenia men's national ice hockey team

References

Ice hockey in Yugoslavia
Former national ice hockey teams
Ice